George Sweeney is a former politician in Newfoundland and Labrador, Canada. He represented Carbonear-Harbour Grace in the Newfoundland and Labrador House of Assembly from 1998 to 2007 as a Liberal.

Born in Carbonear, he was educated in Harbour Grace and at the Carbonear District Vocational School. Before entering politics, Sweeney was an electrician and a community college instructor. He served as government whip and was a member of the provincial cabinet, serving as Minister of Government Services and Lands.

Sweeney has also served as president of the local chamber of commerce and was a founding director of Hospitality Newfoundland and Labrador.

References 

Liberal Party of Newfoundland and Labrador MHAs
Living people
People from Carbonear
21st-century Canadian politicians
Year of birth missing (living people)